The sabin (or more precisely the square foot sabin) is a unit of sound absorption, used for expressing the total effective absorption for the interior of a room. Sound absorption can be expressed in terms of the percentage of energy absorbed compared with the percentage reflected. It can also be expressed as a coefficient, with a value of 1.00 representing a material which absorbs 100% of the energy, and a value of 0.00 meaning all the sound is reflected.

The concept of a unit for absorption was first suggested by American physicist Wallace Clement Sabine, the founder of the field of architectural acoustics. The unit was renamed the sabin after Sabine, and it is now defined as "the absorption due to unit area of a totally absorbent surface".

Sabins may be calculated with either imperial or metric units. One square foot of 100% absorbing material has a value of one imperial sabin, and 1 square metre of 100% absorbing material has a value of one metric sabin.

The total absorption A in metric sabins for a room containing many types of surface is given by
 
where S1, S2, ..., Sn are the areas of the surfaces in the room (m2) and α1, α2, ..., αn are the absorption coefficients of the surfaces. 

Sabins are used in calculating the reverberation time of concert halls, lecture theatres, and recording studios.

References

Sources

External links 
 Understanding sabins from NetWell Noise Control

Units of measurement
Sound measurements